The 1991 World Club Challenge (marketed as the Foster's World Club Challenge due to sponsorship from the brewer) was contested by 1990–91 RFL Championship winners, Wigan and 1991 NSWRL season premiers, the Penrith Panthers. The match was played on a dry Wednesday 2 October 1991 at Anfield, Liverpool. A crowd of 20,152 was in attendance for the game which was refereed by Frenchman Alain Sablayrolles.

Background

Wigan

Penrith Panthers

Teams

Match details

Penrith were without their star grand final forward Mark Geyer due to ankle injury that required surgery while Brad Fittler was unavailable as he was part of the Australian Kangaroos team on their end of season tour of Papua New Guinea (Fittler made his test debut for Australia 4 days after the WCC). 
By just the 13th minute Wigan had gotten away to a handy lead with the score at 8 - 0 after Frano Botica kicked four consecutive penalties. Penrith then answered five minutes later with an unconverted try from Darren Wills. However this was to be the last time Penrith scored in the match. Wigan's Sam Panapa got their first try in the 27th minute which was converted by Botica, bringing the scoreline to 14 - 4 which lasted until half-time.

No points were scored in the second half of the game until two thirds of the way through when Botica kicked a fifth penalty goal. David Myers scored Wigan's second try and the last of the match in the 77th minute. Just before the full-time whistle, Joe Lydon successfully kicked a field goal, adding insult to injury and making the final score Wigan 21, Penrith 4.

References

External links
1991 World Club Challenge at wigan.rlfans.com
1991 World Club Challenge at rugbyleagueproject.com
1991 World Club Challenge at superleague.co.uk

World Club Challenge
Penrith Panthers matches
Wigan Warriors matches
World Club Challenge
World Club Challenge